Home Improvement is an American television sitcom starring Tim Allen that aired on ABC from September 17, 1991 to May 25, 1999 with a total of 204 half-hour episodes spanning eight seasons. The series was created by Matt Williams, Carmen Finestra, and David McFadzean. Despite not being a favorite with critics, it was one of the most watched sitcoms in the United States during the 1990s, winning many awards. The series launched Allen's acting career and was the start of the television career of Pamela Anderson, who was part of the recurring cast for the first two seasons.

Show background 
Based on the stand-up comedy of Tim Allen, Home Improvement made its debut on ABC on September 17, 1991, and was one of the highest-rated sitcoms for almost the entire decade. It went to No. 2 in the ratings during the 1993–1994 season, the same year Allen had the No. 1 book (Don't Stand Too Close to a Naked Man) and film (The Santa Clause).

Beginning in season 2, Home Improvement began each episode with a cold open, which features the show's logo during the teaser. From season 4 until the end of the series in 1999, an anthropomorphic version of the logo was used in different types of animation.

Episodes

Plot details and storylines

Taylor family 
The series centers on the Taylor family, which consists of Tim (Tim Allen), his wife Jill (Patricia Richardson) and their three sons: Brad (Zachery Ty Bryan), Randy (Jonathan Taylor Thomas), and Mark (Taran Noah Smith). The Taylors live in suburban Detroit, and they have a neighbor named Wilson (Earl Hindman) who is often the go-to guy for solving the Taylors' problems.

Tim loves power tools, cars, and sports. An avid fan of the Detroit professional sports teams, Tim wears Lions, Pistons, Red Wings, and Tigers clothing in numerous instances, and many plots revolve around the teams. He is a former salesman for the fictional Binford Tool company, and he is very much a cocky, overambitious, accident-prone know-it-all. Witty but flippant, Tim jokes around a lot, even at inappropriate times, much to the dismay of his wife. However, Tim can sometimes be serious when necessary. Jill, Tim's wife, is loving and sophisticated, but she is not exempt from dumb moves herself. In later seasons, she returns to college to study psychology. Family life is boisterous for the Taylors, with the two oldest children, Brad and Randy, tormenting the much younger Mark, all while continually testing and pestering each other. Such play happened especially throughout the first three seasons, and it was revisited only occasionally until Jonathan Taylor Thomas left at the beginning of the eighth season. During the show's final season, Brad and Mark became much closer due to Randy's absence.

Brad, popular and athletic, was often the moving factor, who engaged before thinking, a tendency which regularly landed him in trouble. Randy, a year younger, was the comedian of the pack, known for his quick thinking, wisecracks, and smart mouth. He had more common sense than Brad but was not immune to trouble. Mark was somewhat of a mama's boy, though later in the series (in the seventh season) he grew into a teenage outcast who dressed in black clothing. Meanwhile, Brad became interested in cars like his father and took up soccer. Randy joined the school drama club and later the school newspaper; in the eighth season, he left for Costa Rica.

In early seasons, Wilson was always seen standing on the other side of Tim's backyard fence as the two engaged in conversation, usually with Wilson offering sage advice as Tim grappled with his problems. In later seasons, a running joke developed in which more and more creative means were used to prevent Wilson's face below the eyes from ever being seen by the audience. Also, in later seasons, Wilson's full name was revealed to be Wilson W. Wilson Jr.

Tool Time 
Each episode includes Tim's own Binford-sponsored home improvement show, called Tool Time, a show-within-a-show. In hosting this show, Tim is joined by his friend and mild-mannered co-host Al Borland (Richard Karn), and a "Tool Time girl"—first Lisa (Pamela Anderson) and later Heidi (Debbe Dunning)—whose main duty is to introduce the pair at the beginning of the show with the line "Does everybody know what time it is?" In reply, the audience yells, "TOOL TIME!" The Tool Time girl also assists Tim and Al during the show by bringing them tools.

Although revealed to be an excellent salesman and TV personality, Tim is spectacularly accident-prone as a handyman, often causing massive disasters on and off the set, to the consternation of his co-workers and family. Many Tool Time viewers assume that the accidents on the show are done on purpose, to demonstrate the consequences of using tools improperly. Many of Tim's accidents are caused by his devices being used in an unorthodox or overpowered manner, designed to illustrate his mantra "More power!" This popular catchphrase was not uttered after Home Improvements seventh season until Tim's last line in the series finale—the last two words ever spoken on the show.

Tool Time was conceived as a parody of the PBS home-improvement show This Old House.  Tim and Al are caricatures of the two principal cast members of This Old House, host Bob Vila and master carpenter Norm Abram. Al Borland has a beard and always wears plaid shirts when taping an episode, reflecting Norm Abram's appearance on This Old House. Bob Vila appeared as a guest star on several episodes of Home Improvement, while Tim Allen and Pamela Anderson both appeared on Bob Vila's show Home Again.

The Tool Time theme music, an early 1960s-style saxophone-dominated instrumental rock tune, was sometimes used as the closing theme music for Home Improvement, especially when behind the credits were running the blooper scenes that took place during the taping of a Tool Time segment.

Characters

Main

Recurring

Production

Development and early recasts 

Home Improvement had been in the works between Tim Allen and the writing/producing team of Carmen Finestra, David McFadzean, and Matt Williams since the summer of 1990. Originally, the project's proposed title was Hammer Time, both a play on the catchphrase made popular by artist MC Hammer and the name of the fictional fix-it show within the series, which was also called Hammer Time. By the time ABC committed to the project in early 1991, Allen and his team had already changed the title to Home Improvement. The show hosted by Tim Taylor in the shooting script for Home Improvement was still called Hammer Time when the first pilot with Frances Fisher was filmed in April 1991. The catalyst for the series' name change was to represent the aspect of fixing problems within the family and home life, as well as the use of mechanics and tools. Once the second phase of the pilot was produced, with all the actors that made the final cut into the series (including Patricia Richardson), Tim Taylor's Hammer Time became Tool Time.

As mentioned above, the first pilot was produced in April 1991, with Frances Fisher playing Jill Taylor. Fisher, primarily known as a dramatic actress, was well qualified for the co-starring role but was viewed by the studio audience as not being comedic enough, and too serious in her line delivery. The producers tried to work with Fisher on adapting to the situation comedy setting, but shortly after the pilot wrapped post-production, they decided to recast her.

Before the first pilot was shot, actor John Bedford Lloyd was in the running for one of two roles; that of Tim's Tool Time co-host (originally named "Glen") and the role of Wilson. Bedford Lloyd eventually got the part of Wilson, but his agent later made claims that the actor was unaware that most of his scenes would require his face to be partially hidden behind a fence. For this reason, the crew received news just one day prior to taping the first pilot that Bedford Lloyd had dropped out. Casting immediately contacted the other actor considered for the role, Earl Hindman.

Stephen Tobolowsky was tapped to play the Tool Time co-host, Glen. However, he was still busy with a movie that was in the middle of production at the time the first pilot was to be shot. Therefore, the producers set out to cast an alternate character that would stand in as Tim's co-host for the pilot, or for however many episodes were required until Tobolowsky was available. The casting department auditioned Richard Karn, for what would be his first major appearance on a TV sitcom; the character of Al Borland was created from there. After the first few episodes completed with Patricia Richardson as Jill, Tobolowsky was still tied up with his other commitments, and Karn found himself in his role permanently when Tobolowsky decided he would have no time to do a series. Thus, the character of Glen never came into being.

Casting changes

Pamela Anderson 
In the first two years of the show, Pamela Anderson played the part of Tim's Tool Girl, Lisa, on Tool Time, but left the show to focus on her role on the syndicated series Baywatch. Her last episode as a series regular was "The Great Race", which aired on May 19, 1993. Tim's new assistant, electrician Heidi Keppert, played by Debbe Dunning, replaced Anderson as the Tool Time Girl for the following third season, starting with "Maybe Baby", which aired on September 15, 1993. Dunning had previously appeared (not as Heidi) in the episode "Overactive Glance" from season 2 where she played an obsessive Tool Time fan named Kiki. Anderson did reprise the role of Lisa on the sixth-season finale episode "The Kiss and the Kiss-Off", which aired on May 20, 1997.

Departure of Jonathan Taylor Thomas 
In the show's eighth and final season, the middle child Randy left for an environmental study program in Costa Rica in the episode "Adios", which aired on September 29, 1998. This was done because Jonathan Taylor Thomas reportedly wanted to take time off to focus on his academics. His last appearance on Home Improvement was the eighth season Christmas episode "Home for the Holidays", which aired on December 8, 1998.  He did not return to the show for the series finale (as he was busy with his education and filming the movie Speedway Junky, released in 2001), only appearing in archived footage.

End of series 
The series ended after eight seasons in 1999. Richardson was offered $25 million to do a ninth season; Allen was offered $50 million. The two declined the offer and the series came to an end as a result.

Michigan college and university apparel 
Throughout the show, Tim Taylor would often be wearing sweatshirts or T-shirts from various Michigan-based colleges and universities. These were usually sent by the schools to the show for him to wear during an episode. Because Allen considered Michigan his home state, the rule was that only Michigan schools would get the free advertising. There were two notable exceptions to the general rule that Tim only supported Michigan educational institutions on the show. First, during the episode "Workshop 'Til You Drop" Tim wears a Wofford College (South Carolina) sweatshirt. Second, during the episode "The Wood, the Bad and the Hungry" Tim wears an Owens Community College (Ohio) sweatshirt.

Syndication 
In the United States, Home Improvement began airing in broadcast syndication in September 1995, distributed via Buena Vista Television (now Disney–ABC Domestic Television) and continued to be syndicated until 2007, in a manner similar to Seinfeld and The Simpsons after they began airing in broadcast syndication. Episodes of Home Improvement were not aired in order of their production code number or original airdate.  On cable, the series started airing in 2002 on superstations TBS and WGN America.  It later ran on Nick at Nite and its sister network TV Land, and eventually the Hallmark Channel in 2013.

Home media
Walt Disney Studios Home Entertainment has released all eight seasons on DVD in Region 1, 2, and 4. Season 8 has the "Backstage Pass" (which immediately followed "The Long and Winding Road, Part III")

On May 10, 2011, Walt Disney Studios released a complete series box set entitled Home Improvement: 20th Anniversary Complete Collection on DVD in Region 1. The 25-disc collection features all 204 episodes of the series as well as all special features contained on the previously released season sets; it is encased in special collectible packaging, a Home Improvement toolbox with a Binford "All-In-One Tool" tape measure.

DVD notes

The Region 1 DVDs are on three discs (with the exception of the final season set, which has four discs), whereas the Region 2 DVDs are presented across four discs, but in Germany the fourth to seventh seasons are also three-disc sets. The Region 2 packaging and program menus for Season 1 vary compared to the Region 1 releases. The Season 3 menus in Region 1 are in widescreen, but 4:3 in Region 2. The Region 1 releases of Seasons 2 and 3 consist of (deliberate) "holes" in the outer packaging—these do not exist in the Region 2 releases; in fact, the Season 3 outer packaging is physically printed where the hole would be in the Region 1 packaging.

Seasons 5 and 6 accidentally contain some slightly edited episodes, most likely due to using syndication prints. And the episode "The Feminine Mistake" from season 6, doesn't contain the 3D version of the episode as originally aired on ABC, instead using the 2D version as seen in syndication.

It has been mentioned on review sites about the lack of episode commentaries and bonus features on the DVDs (except unaired blooper reels). In an interview on About.com, Tim Allen stated that it was a done deal that the DVDs would not contain interviews or episode commentaries. Whether this was before or after someone at Disney ordered the three commentaries available on the Season 1 DVDs is unknown.

Reception

Nielsen ratings

During its eight-season run, the show always finished in the top 10 in the Nielsen ratings during a season, despite never making the #1 slot (its highest finish was a second-place spot in the show's third season; behind 60 Minutes). The series finale became the fifth highest-rated series finale television program of the 1990s and the ninth overall series finale ever presented on a single network in television history, watched by 35.5 percent of the households sampled in America, and 21.6 percent of television viewers.

Awards, nominations, and other reception

Though never a hit with critics, Home Improvement received numerous awards and nominations in its eight-season run. Notable awards and nominations include: Golden Globe Awards, Primetime Emmy Awards, Kids' Choice Awards, Young Artist Awards, YoungStar Awards, and ASCAP Award.

On Metacritic, the first season holds a score of 64 out of 100, based on 18 critics and the second season holds a score of 75 out of 100, based on 5 critics, both indicating "generally favorable reviews.”

Post-series events
Tim Allen, Richard Karn, Casey Sander, and Debbe Dunning had a reunion in a television special named Tim Allen Presents: A User's Guide to Home Improvement in 2003 (a terminally ill Earl Hindman did voice-overs, befitting his never-seen persona of Wilson; Hindman died shortly after the special aired). Allen presented his own favorite clips from the show, insider's tips, personal reflections and a question and answer session with the live audience.

On August 3, 2011, in Pacific Palisades, California, the surviving main cast members reunited for Entertainment Weekly magazine, including Jonathan Taylor Thomas, whom the cast had not seen since 1998.

Karn guest starred in two episodes of Tim Allen's 2010s ABC/Fox sitcom Last Man Standing in 2013. Thomas has also appeared on Last Man Standing, and has directed episodes of the series.

In 2015, Patricia Richardson guest starred on Last Man Standing in the episode "Helen Potts", playing the episode's titular character. Thomas made a cameo in the episode, playing Richardson's son.

On May 5, 2015, Hollywood Life reported that Allen and Karn had admitted talking about getting back together as a cast for a Home Improvement reboot or reunion show. Karn was quoted as saying, "There is always a chance, absolutely. Would I be on board? Yeah, I think so! I would love to see what the story lines could be, it could be very funny!"

On February 18, 2020, CinemaBlend reported that Allen wants to bring back Home Improvement for a revival:

I like the idea of doing it as a one-off, like a one-hour movie [versus a full-fledged revival series]. I like the idea of finding out where the boys are now, and where... Tool Time would be in today's world. I just think it's a marvelous idea, and all the actors think it's a great idea.

In January 2021, Allen reprised his role of Tim Taylor in an episode of Last Man Standing titled "Dual Time".

Premiering in February 2021, Tim Allen and Richard Karn, teamed up with YouTuber DIYer April Wilkerson, on History Channel unscripted competition show Assembly Required; where home handymen/makers/DIYers/inventors, compete to build souped up home tools a la Tool Time from Home Improvement, with supplied parts and pieces, and some of their own junk at home.

Premiering in June 2022, Tim Allen and Richard Karn, teamed up with YouTuber DIYer April Wilkerson, on History Channel documentary series More Power; where the hosts cover the history of tools, again a la Tool Time from Home Improvement.

References

External links 

 Official homepage
 
 
 The Home Improvement Archive
 UltimateDisney.com – Seasons 1–8 DVD Reviews
 Home Improvement Seasons 1–8 on DVD

Home Improvement (TV series)
1990s American sitcoms
1991 American television series debuts
1999 American television series endings
American Broadcasting Company original programming
English-language television shows
Television shows adapted into video games
Television series about families
Television series about television
Television series by ABC Studios
Television shows set in Michigan
Television shows set in Detroit